"El Viaje Misterioso de Nuestro Jomer (The Mysterious Voyage of Homer)", also known as "The Mysterious Voyage of Our Homer", is the ninth episode of the eighth season of the American animated television series The Simpsons. It originally aired on the Fox network in the United States on January 5, 1997. In the episode, Homer eats several hot chili peppers and hallucinates, causing him to go on a mysterious voyage. Following this, he questions his relationship with Marge and goes on a journey to find his soulmate.

"El Viaje Misterioso de Nuestro Jomer (The Mysterious Voyage of Homer)" was written by Ken Keeler and directed by Jim Reardon. The episode explores themes of marriage, community, and alcohol use. Homer's voyage features surreal animation to depict the elaborate hallucination. The episode guest stars Johnny Cash as the "Space Coyote".

Plot
Marge becomes suspiciously cautious by trying different tactics to distract Homer from some event. She tries to mask an odor by smoking cigarettes in the house, but after stepping outside Homer smells the scent of Springfield's annual chili cook-off. Marge finally admits trying to dissuade Homer from going due to his drunken antics at the previous year's cook-off. She agrees to let him attend after he promises to not drink beer.

At the cook-off, Homer shows an extraordinary ability to withstand hot foods, but is burned by Chief Wiggum's fiery chili made with Guatemalan insanity peppers, and is caught by Marge while attempting to cool his tongue with beer; she believes he was intentionally getting drunk. While quenching the heat with water, Homer nearly drinks melted candle wax by mistake before Ralph Wiggum warns him not to. Homer realizes he can use the wax to coat and protect his mouth, enabling him to swallow several insanity peppers whole.

After winning the chili-eating contest, Homer hallucinates wildly from the peppers. During his trip, he meets his spirit guide in the form of a coyote, who advises him to find his soulmate and questions Homer's assumption that Marge is his. Helen Lovejoy, the gossipy preacher's wife, tells Marge about Homer's antics; thinking they are alcohol-induced, an upset Marge drives home without him.

The next day, Homer awakes on a golf course. He returns home to find Marge angry with him for his embarrassing behavior at the cook-off. Homer makes note of their fundamental personality differences and questions if they truly are soulmates.

Roaming the streets at night, he thinks a lonely lighthouse keeper is his soulmate, but finds the lighthouse is operated by a machine once he arrives there. Seeing a ship approaching, Homer destroys the lighthouse's huge bulb, hoping its passengers will befriend him after their ship crashes ashore. An apologetic Marge arrives, having known exactly where Homer would go. They reconcile after realizing they really are soulmates despite their differences. After fixing the light, the ship runs aground nearby and spills its cargo of hotpants. Springfield's citizens happily retrieve them as Marge and Homer embrace.

Production

The episode was pitched as early as the third season by George Meyer, who was interested in an episode based on the books of Carlos Castaneda. Meyer had wanted to have an episode featuring a mystical voyage that was not induced by drugs, and so he decided to use "really hot" chili peppers instead. The staff, except for Matt Groening, felt it was too odd for the show at that point. Bill Oakley and Josh Weinstein resurrected the story, and decided to use it for season eight.

Most of the hallucination sequence was animated completely by David Silverman. Silverman did not want the risk of sending it to South Korea, as he wanted it to look exactly as he had imagined it, including rendered backgrounds to give a soft mystical feel to the scene. The coyote was intentionally drawn in a boxier way so that it looked "other-worldly" and unlike the other characters. During Homer's voyage, the clouds in one shot are live-action footage, and 3D computer animation was used for the giant butterfly. During the same hallucination, Ned Flanders' line was treated on a Mac computer so that it increased and decreased pitch.

The Fox censors sent a note to the writers, questioning Homer coating his mouth with hot wax. The note read: "To discourage imitation by young and foolish viewers, when Homer begins to pour hot wax into his mouth, please have him scream in pain so kids will understand that doing this would actually burn their mouths." The scream was not added; however, they did add dialog from Ralph Wiggum, questioning Homer on his action. Reardon also created a "wax-chart" for Homer for the animators to follow during the sequence when Homer's mouth is coated with candle-wax.

Homer waking up on a golf course is a reference to something that actually happened: a friend of the producers blacked out and woke up on a golf course. He had to buy a map from 7-Eleven to find out where he was. He discovered that not only was he in a different town, he was also in a different state. He walked several miles to return to a friend's house, which was the last place he remembered being the night before.

Casting
Johnny Cash and Bob Dylan were the writers' top two choices to play the coyote; the writers had wanted to use one of The Highwaymen as the voice of the spirit guide. Dylan had turned the show down many times, having previously been offered a role in the season seven episode "Homerpalooza". Cash was offered the role, which he accepted. Matt Groening described Cash's appearance as "one of the greatest coups the show has ever had".

Cultural references
The main plot of the episode is based on the works of Carlos Castaneda, with some of the Native American imagery being similar to that used in the film Dances with Wolves. The lighthouse keeper actually being a computer is a reference to the episode of The Twilight Zone called "The Old Man in the Cave", in which a man in a cave turns out to be a computer. The main theme from The Good, the Bad and the Ugly is used during the scenes when Homer walks into the chili festival, and the song "At Seventeen" by Janis Ian plays in the background as Homer walks through the town of Springfield looking for his soul-mate after he wakes up from his vision. The scene at the end of Homer's hallucination, when the train is heading towards him, is a reference to the opening titles of Soul Train. Homer's record collection features albums by Jim Nabors, Glen Campbell, and The Doodletown Pipers.

Reception and legacy

In its original broadcast, "El Viaje Misterioso de Nuestro Jomer (The Mysterious Voyage of Homer)" finished 34th in ratings for the week of December 30, 1996 – January 5, 1997, with a Nielsen rating of 9.0, equivalent to approximately 8.7 million viewing households. It was the highest-rated show on the Fox network that week.

The authors of the book I Can't Believe It's a Bigger and Better Updated Unofficial Simpsons Guide, Warren Martyn and Adrian Wood, said: "Homer's chili-induced trip is brilliant, complete with the surreal tortoise and Indian spirit guide." The episode was placed eighth on AskMen.com's "Top 10: Simpsons Episodes" list, and in his book Planet Simpson, Chris Turner named the episode as being one of his five favorites, although he found the ending too sentimental. In 2019, Time ranked the episode seventh in its list of 10 best Simpsons episodes picked by Simpsons experts.

In 2011, Keith Plocek of LA Weeklys Squid Ink blog listed "El Viaje Misterioso de Nuestro Jomer (The Mysterious Voyage of Homer)" as the best episode of the show with a food theme.

IGN ranked Johnny Cash's performance as the 14th-best guest appearance in the show's history. Cash also appeared on AOL's list of their 25 favorite The Simpsons guest stars, and on The Times Simon Crerar's list of the 33 funniest cameos in the history of the show. Andrew Martin of Prefix Mag named Cash his third-favorite musical guest on The Simpsons out of a list of ten.

Fred Topel of Crave Online named it the best episode of the entire series.

The episode was later adapted for the Simpsons Level Pack in the 2015 video game Lego Dimensions as the exclusive level for Homer Simpson.

References

Bibliography

External links

1997 American television episodes
The Simpsons (season 8) episodes
Television episodes written by Ken Keeler
Adaptations of works by Carlos Castaneda